"Ooh Stick You" is the debut single recorded of American pop duo Daphne and Celeste. It was released on January 24, 2000, as the lead single from their debut album, We Didn't Say That!. It reached number eight in the United Kingdom, number 40 in Ireland, number 54 in Australia, and number five in New Zealand, where it went platinum for sales of over 10,000.

Track listings
Australian CD single
 "Ooh Stick You..." (radio edit)
 "Ooh Stick You..." (Def Master dub)
 "Ooh Stick You..." (Amen club mix)
 "Ooh Stick You..." (Twelve Inch Stick)
 "Ooh Stick You..." (Amen alternative club)
 "Ooh Stick You..." (Mint Royale vocal dub)

UK CD single
 "Ooh Stick You" (radio edit) – 3:27
 "Ooh Stick You" (Twelve Inch Stick) – 4:25
 "Ooh Stick You" (Mint Royale vocal dub) – 5:20
 "Ooh Stick You" (video)

UK cassette single
 "Ooh Stick You" (radio edit) – 3:28
 "Ooh Stick You" (Twelve Inch Stick) – 4:22

Charts

Weekly charts

Year-end charts

Certifications

References

1999 songs
2000 debut singles
Daphne and Celeste songs
Universal Records singles